Glanvilles is a village in Saint Philip Parish, Antigua and Barbuda.

There is a clinic in Glanvilles that was not in use for a long period of time, but after protests in 2021, the clinic was opened, after only being used as a COVID-19 testing center.

Demographics 
Glanvilles has two enumeration districts.

 60900 Glanvilles-Central 
 61000 Glanvilles-Outer

Census Data (2011)

References 

Populated places in Antigua and Barbuda
Saint Philip Parish, Antigua and Barbuda